José Arnulfo Montiel Núñez (born 19 March 1988 in Asunción) is a Paraguayan footballer who plays as a midfielder for Deportivo Santaní.

Career
At a very young age, Montiel began his career in his hometown team Olimpia, which is a division of Olimpia Asunción in Itauguá city's football league. Scouts from Olimpia Asunción noticed his talent and signed him to the youth divisions of the Asunción club.
Montiel was a key part of the Paraguay national under-15 football team that won the 2004 South American Under-15 Championship.

His professional debut came playing for Olimpia late in 2004, at the age of 16. Montiel's excellent vision and skills secured him a place in the first squad. In 2005, he was included in the Paraguay national football team at the age of 17.

After the 2006 World Cup, Montiel joined Udinese Calcio. Following one season with the club, he was sold to Reggina. In the 2008–2009 season, he was loaned to the Romanian Liga I team Politenica Iaşi, helping them to avoid relegation.

For the 2009–2010 season, Montiel was loaned to the Argentine club Tigre, making his debut on the 2nd day of Apertura 2009 tournament. He substituted Lucas Oviedo in the game against Rosario Central.
He returned to Italy in March 2010. In the season 2010/2011 he is bought to definitive title by the Reggina.

Following a period at Benevento between 2012-2014. Montiel returned to Olimpia for the 2014 Clausura where he played 14 games before moving to the Copa Libertadores finalist Nacional Asunción in 2015. In 2016, he has signed a one-year contract with the Peruvian side Unión Comercio.

Ahead of the 2020 season, Montiel joined 12 de Octubre. 10 months later, in October 2020, he moved to Guaireña. However, he returned to 12 de Octubre again in January 2021. In July 2021, he moved to General Caballero JLM. Ahead of the 2022 season, Montiel signed with Deportivo Santaní.

References

External links
 
 
 
 

1988 births
Living people
Sportspeople from Asunción
Paraguayan footballers
Paraguay international footballers
Paraguay under-20 international footballers
Paraguayan expatriate footballers
Club Olimpia footballers
Udinese Calcio players
Reggina 1914 players
Benevento Calcio players
FC Politehnica Iași (1945) players
Club Atlético Tigre footballers
Club Nacional footballers
Unión Comercio footballers
Sport Huancayo footballers
Ayacucho FC footballers
Panachaiki F.C. players
12 de Octubre Football Club players
Al-Shamal SC players
Deportivo Santaní players
Serie A players
Serie B players
Serie C players
Liga I players
Argentine Primera División players
Paraguayan Primera División players
Peruvian Primera División players
Expatriate footballers in Italy
Expatriate footballers in Argentina
Expatriate footballers in Romania
Expatriate footballers in Peru
Expatriate footballers in Greece
Expatriate footballers in Qatar
Paraguayan expatriate sportspeople in Romania
Paraguayan expatriate sportspeople in Argentina
Paraguayan expatriate sportspeople in Italy
Paraguayan expatriate sportspeople in Peru
Paraguayan expatriate sportspeople in Greece
2006 FIFA World Cup players
Association football midfielders
Qatari Second Division players